The minister of fisheries, oceans and the Canadian Coast Guard is the minister of the Crown in the Canadian Cabinet responsible for supervising the fishing industry, administrating all navigable waterways in the country, and overseeing the operations of the Canadian Coast Guard and the Freshwater Fish Marketing Corporation.

The minister is the head of the Government of Canada's marine department, Fisheries and Oceans Canada, often referred to by its older (and technical) name: the Department of Fisheries and Oceans.

History 
There was a minister of marine and fisheries from Confederation in 1867 onwards. The role was split in two in 1930, with duties related to fisheries going to the new minister of fisheries, and all other responsibilities going to the new minister of marine, which was merged into the role of minister of transport a few years later. 

The minister of fisheries lasted from 1930 to 1969, at which point the post was merged with forestry to create the post of minister of fisheries and forestry. This lasted only two years, until 1971, when the minister of fisheries became a secondary role held concurrently by the minister of the environment. In 1974 the fisheries portfolio was assigned to Roméo LeBlanc as the minister of state (fisheries) assisting the minister of the environment. When LeBlanc was appointed as the minister of the environment in 1976, the post was restyled minister of fisheries and environment. 

The current post of minister of fisheries and oceans was established in 1979, and it has continued under various names since then. Hunter Tootoo was the first Indigenous person to hold this portfolio, from November 4, 2015 until May 31, 2016.

Ministers of Marine and Fisheries (1867-1930)
Key:

Ministers of Fisheries (1930-1969)
Key:

Ministers of Fisheries and Forestry (1969-1971)
Key:

Ministers responsible for Fisheries through the Department of Environment (1971-1979)

Key:

Ministers of Fisheries and Oceans (1979-present)
Key:

References

.
Fisheries and Oceans
Canadian Coast Guard
Coasts of Canada
Fisheries in Canada
Fishing in Canada